Feral donkeys were first brought to Australia as pack animals to replace horses, which had succumbed to native poisonous plants. Now numbering 5 million, they have been declared a pest, owing to their damage to vegetation and erosion of soil. Culling is mainly carried out by marksmen in helicopters, and experiments are being made in fertility control.

History
Feral donkeys in Australia (and elsewhere) are donkeys (scientific name Equus asinus) which escaped from captivity, and are living and breeding in the wild.
Donkeys originated in Africa and in parts of Asia. They are a part of the family Equidae. While donkeys display many horse-like characteristics, they are more closely related to wild asses.

Donkeys were brought to Australia from 1866 for use as pack and haulage animals. Up until that point, the Australians had been using the horse as their main mode of transportation. However, problems arose when the horses used in transportation began to become sickened by some of the native poisonous plants. When donkeys proved to be invulnerable to the plants that were making the horses sick, more donkeys were brought in. Escape was common because of the lack of fences, and there were reported herds of donkeys by the 1920s. In western Australia in 1949, there were enough donkeys for them to officially be declared a pest. There were almost 5 million feral donkeys in Australia in 2005.

Food sources
Donkeys are herbivores, and only eat vegetation. All year round, the donkeys graze for grass, shrubs, and tree bark. Donkeys usually graze for 6 to 7 hours a day and can go a fair distance from water sources. There are over 1 million donkeys living in Australia, which means that the donkeys eat a significant amount of vegetation. The donkeys can readily find food in winter if it is wet; however food is much less plentiful in times of drought.

Ecological effect
The donkeys seriously affect the environment they live in. Their presence can cause a wide range of problems: they may spread weeds by carrying seeds in their hair and feces, they may damage vegetation through overeating, they may foul watering holes in the drought season, and they can cause erosion with their hard hooves. These damages, particularly those to the watering holes, have the potential to make native plants and animals locally extinct. The donkeys also affect local agriculture. They sometimes can over eat pasture grasses and destroy fences. They are also known to infect domestic animals with diseases.

On the contrary to above, some researchers claim that donkey's ecological niche, like that of other introduced large herbivores, may also correspond to lost niches of extinct Australian megafauna and benefit native ecosystem.

Control
Since the donkeys in Australia are considered a pest, they are often controlled by being mustered. Helicopters with highly trained and accredited shooters have replaced this technique in places where the terrain makes mustering too difficult. Also seeing some limited use is fertility control. This, however, is difficult with large numbers of undomesticated animals and it is unknown whether this technique will make a difference on such a large number of animals. Some good cattle breeders are using donkeys against dingos and foxes. There is some trafficking of donkey skin for making donkey-hide gelatin in traditional Chinese medicine.

See also

 Australian feral camel

References

External links
 History of Horses in Australia at ThinkQuest

Feral donkeys
Fauna naturalised in Australia
Donkeys in Australia
Invasive animal species in Australia